Cost Price is a 1949 adventure novel by the English author Dornford Yates (Cecil William Mercer), the eighth and last in his 'Chandos' thriller series. It serves as a sequel to his 1932 novel Safe Custody. The book was published in the US under the title The Laughing Bacchante.

Plot 
With Austria threatened by the Anschluss, John and Olivia Ferrers ask Richard Chandos and Jonathan Mansel to help them recover the priceless carved jewels collection of the Borgia Pope Alexander VI that, at the end of Safe Custody, had been left in a walled-up chamber of Hohenems Castle in Carinthia. Punter, a minor villain who had been part of a previous attempt to steal them, tells the educated crook Friar the story of that venture and Friar, along with his associates Sloper, Orris and Goat, decides to make a further attempt. After Mansel foils them, Friar deliberately attracts the attention of a German, Boler, to try and make Mansel's task more problematic. Diana Revoke, apparently an upper-class Englishwoman, appears on the scene and adds to the heroes' difficulties. Having extracted the gems, and briefly taken refuge in Wagensburg Castle (the scene of the action in Blind Corner), Chandos joins a group of strolling players led by Jasper and Colette, to help smuggle them over the border into Italy and eventually to England where they are destined for a museum. Other characters from previous novels include the manservants Bell and Carson, Andrew Palin, and Jenny Chandos.

Background 
The book was published soon after Mercer had completed the building of a new house in Southern Rhodesia to which he and his wife had retired. This was his replacement for "Cockade" in Southern France (described in The House That Berry Built) which was empty and still a worry to him.

Critical reception 

Mercer's biographer AJ Smithers, writing in 1982, expressed admiration for the way in which Mercer marshalled his characters. By continually bringing back old friends who give the impression of being one big family, his readers feel almost honorary family members themselves.

References

Bibliography
 

1949 British novels
Ward, Lock & Co. books
Novels by Dornford Yates
British thriller novels